Zygaena orana is a species of moth in the family Zygaenidae. It is found on Sardinia and in North Africa, including Morocco, Algeria and Tunisia.

The larvae feed on Lotus creticus and Lotus cytisoides. Last instar larvae are pea-green with lateral rows of black spots and yellow blotches forming a well-marked yellow stripe. Pupation takes place in a dark brown and green pupa.

Subspecies
Zygaena orana orana
Zygaena orana contristans Oberthür, 1922
Zygaena orana oberthueri Bethune-Baker, 1888
Zygaena orana sardoa Mabille 1892
Zygaena orana tatla Reiss, 1943
Zygaena orana tirhboulensis Hofmann & G. Reiss, 1982

References

Moths described in 1835
Zygaena
Moths of Europe
Moths of Africa